The 1993 XXIX FIBA International Christmas Tournament "Trofeo Raimundo Saporta-Memorial Fernando Martín" was the 29th edition of the FIBA International Christmas Tournament. It took place at Palacio de Deportes de la Comunidad de Madrid, Madrid, Spain, on 24, 25 and 26 December 1993 with the participations of Real Madrid Teka (champions of the 1992–93 Liga ACB), Brazil All-Stars, Stefanel Trieste and Estudiantes Argentaria (semifinalists of the 1992–93 Liga ACB).

League stage

Day 1, December 24, 1993

|}

Day 2, December 25, 1993

|}

Day 3, December 26, 1993

|}

Final standings

References

1993–94 in European basketball
1993–94 in Brazilian basketball
1993–94 in Italian basketball
1993–94 in Spanish basketball